is a town located on Amami Ōshima, in Ōshima District, Kagoshima Prefecture, Japan.

As of June 2013, the town had an estimated population of 5,992 and a population density of 73 persons per km2. The total area was 82.06 km2.

Geography
Tatsugō occupies the northern portion of Amami Ōshima, facing the East China Sea to the east and the Pacific Ocean to the west. It is bordered by the city of Amami to both the south and the north. The climate is classified as humid subtropical (Köppen climate classification Cfa) with very warm summers and mild winters. Precipitation is high throughout the year, but is highest in the months of May, June and September. The area is subject to frequent typhoons.

Surrounding municipalities
Amami

History
Tatsugō Village was established on April 1, 1908. As with all of the Amami Islands, the village came under the administration of the United States from July 1, 1946 to December 25, 1953.  It was elevated to town status on February 10, 1975.

Economy
The town economy is primarily based on agriculture, with sugar cane and citrus horticulture as the main crops, and commercial fishing. The Amami Nature Observation Forest, in the Nakagumo mountains, is in the center of Tatsugō and is a popular ecotourist attractive.

Transportation

Highway
Japan National Route 58

References

External links

  

Towns in Kagoshima Prefecture
Populated coastal places in Japan